Zoran Paunović (born 19 July 2000) is a Serbian professional basketball player for Sloga of the Basketball League of Serbia and the ABA League Second Division.

Early career 
Paunović started to play basketball in his hometown Niš, for the OKK Konstantin youth selections. In Summer 2014, he joined the Crvena zvezda youth. He won the second place at the 2017–18 Junior ABA League season with the Zvezda. Over six season games, he averaged 14.2 points, 5.7 rebounds and 3.2 assists per game. In August 2017, he participated at the Basketball Without Borders Europe Camp 16 in Netanya, Israel.

Professional career 
In January 2018, Paunović was added to the Crvena zvezda ABA League roster for the rest of the 2017–18 season. He missed to play a single game during that season. On 25 July 2018, Paunović signed a four-year professional contract with Crvena zvezda. Prior to the 2018–19 season he was loaned out to FMP. On 28 August 2019, Crveza zvezda parted ways with him.

On 11 September 2019, Paunović signed for Dynamic Belgrade. In May 2020, after the COVID-19 pandemic ban, he joined a training camp of Partizan.

On 22 June 2021, Paunović signed for Podgorica.

National team career
Paunović was a member of the Serbian under-16 team that competed at the 2016 FIBA Europe Under-16 Championship in Poland. Over seven tournament games, he averaged 14.6 points, 4.0 rebounds and 2.9 assists per game. Paunović was a member of the Serbian under-18 team that won the gold medal at the 2018 FIBA Europe Under-18 Championship in Latvia. Over seven tournament games, he averaged 16.7 points, 4.1 rebounds and 3.4 assists per game. Paunović was a member of the Serbian under-19 team that finished 7th at the 2019 FIBA Under-19 Basketball World Cup in Heraklion, Greece. Over seven tournament games, he averaged 7.3 points, 4.6 rebounds and 4.4 assists per game.

References

External links 
 Profile at eurobasket.com
 Profile at euroleague.net
 Profile at realgm.com
 Profile at ABA League

2000 births
Living people
ABA League players
Basketball League of Serbia players
KK Crvena zvezda youth players
KK Dynamic players
KK FMP players
KK Metalac Valjevo players
KK Podgorica players
Shooting guards
Serbian expatriate basketball people in Montenegro
Serbian men's basketball players
Basketball players from Niš